Christine Beier (born 12 December 1983) is a German handball player for Spreefüxxe Berlin and the German national team.

References

1983 births
Living people
German female handball players
People from Kyritz
Sportspeople from Brandenburg